Maria de Conceição Cipriano (born 18 December 1943) is a Brazilian athlete. She competed in the women's high jump at the 1968 Summer Olympics.

References

External links
 

1943 births
Living people
Athletes (track and field) at the 1963 Pan American Games
Athletes (track and field) at the 1968 Summer Olympics
Athletes (track and field) at the 1971 Pan American Games
Brazilian female high jumpers
Olympic athletes of Brazil
Athletes from Rio de Janeiro (city)
Pan American Games athletes for Brazil